Wrong Highway Blues is the sixth studio album by the progressive bluegrass band Northern Lights. 
The band plays as a quintet for the first time on this album as Jake Armerding, son of mandolinist Taylor Armerding, joins the band on violin and harmony vocals. He has played as a full member of the band since 1992, joining at the young age of 14, but started performing gigs with the Northern Lights at the age of 12.

Track listing
 Living Without You (Armerding) 4:19
 Climb a Tall Mountain (Pennell) 3:26
 Guns of November (Mellyn) 5:32
 Sunny Side of Blue (Henry) 3:39
 Fisherman's Lament (Henry) 3:46
 Walking Away (Henry) 4:58
 Wrong Highway Blues (Armerding) 4:01
 Holding On (Henry) 4:05
 Buss Stop (Kropp) 3:51
 Give Me Back Tomorrow (Pennell) 3:35
 Ray of Hope (Henry) 3:43
 Soldier of the Cross (L.Rowan) 3:42

Personnel
 Taylor Armerding - mandolin, guitar, vocals
 Jeff Horton - bass, vocals
 Bill Henry - vocals, guitar
 Mike Kropp - banjo, guitar
 Jake Armerding - violin, vocals

References

External links
Official site

1994 albums
Northern Lights (bluegrass band) albums